Wildenstein Castle is a ruined hill castle on a hill, in the Wildenstein valley (Wildensteiner Tal), hidden in a wood at the foot of the Donnersberg near Dannenfels in the county of Donnersbergkreis in the German state of Rhineland-Palatinate.

The castles is of the motte and bailey type. Together with the three other ruined castles of Falkenstein, Hohenfels and Tannenfels, it forms the ring of the "Donnersberg Castles".

References

External links 
 Wildenstein Castle at pfalzlexikon.de
 Excerprt from the pfälzischen Burgenlexikon (Palatine Castle Lexicon): Burg Wildenstein

Castles in Rhineland-Palatinate
Heritage sites in Rhineland-Palatinate
Donnersbergkreis